Gyeryongsan is a mountain located in Geoje, South Gyeongsang Province, South Korea.

See also
Geography of Korea
List of mountains in Korea
List of mountains by elevation
Mountain portal
South Korea portal

References

Mountains of South Gyeongsang Province
Geoje
Mountains of South Korea